The Ravan Baku 2013-14 season was Ravan Baku's third, and final, season in the Azerbaijan Premier League, after finishing 10th and being relegated. They also reached the Semifinals of the Azerbaijan Cup where they were defeated by Neftchi Baku. It was to be Ramil Aliyev's first full season as manager, however he resigned on 12 August 2013 following 2 successive defeats and Ravan bottom of the table, Vladislav Kadyrov took over as manager. Kadyrov was himself was replaced on 7 October by Shahin Diniyev, who resigned on 3 January 2014  with Güvenç Kurtar being appointed in his place.

Squad

Transfers

Summer

In:

 

 

 

 

 
 

 

Out:

Winter

In:

 

Out:

Competitions

Friendlies

Azerbaijan Premier League

Results summary

Results by round

Results

League table

Azerbaijan Cup

Squad statistics

Appearances and goals

|-
|colspan="14"|Players who appeared for Ravan Baku no longer at the club:

|}

Goal scorers

Disciplinary record

References
Qarabağ have played their home games at the Tofiq Bahramov Stadium since 1993 due to the ongoing situation in Quzanlı.
Baku vs Ravan was played at the Tofiq Bahramov Stadium training ground due to the Tofiq Bahramov Stadium pitch being relaid.

External links 
 Ravan Baku at Soccerway.com

Ravan Baku FC seasons
Ravan Baku